David Townsend may refer to:

David Townsend (botanist) (1787–1858), American botanist and banker
David Wood Townsend (1844–1912), American builder
David Townsend (art director) (1891–1935), American art director
David Townsend (cricketer, born 1912) (1912–1997), English cricketer
David R. Townsend Jr. (born 1943), member of the New York State Assembly
David Townsend (musician) (1955–2005), American musician
David Townsend (rower) (born 1955), British rower
David Townsend (Devon cricketer) (born 1965), former English cricketer

See also
Dave Townsend, British songwriter, lyricist, and singer
Devin Townsend (born 1972), Canadian Progressive Metal musician